12/5 may refer to:
December 5 in month/day date notation
May 12 in day/month date notation
12 shillings and 5 pence in UK predecimal currency
The dodecagram, Schläfli symbol 12/5

See also
 125 (disambiguation)
 5/12 (disambiguation)